School Days is a Japanese visual novel developed by 0verflow, released on April 2005, for Windows as an adult game. It was later ported as a DVD game and for the PlayStation 2 (PS2) and PlayStation Portable (PSP). The story, a dramatic slice-of-life, follows Makoto Ito, a high school student who becomes the ambivalent love interest of several girls during his second term, and the effects this has on himself and his relationships with other characters. Though the game requires little interaction from users, School Days engages the player through a plot that they are given opportunities to change the course of during play. The game concludes with an ending specific to the outcome of the story, some of which became notorious for their graphic violence.

0verflow announced work on School Days in October 2004 and marketed it through public venues that showcased the game's innovative use of anime-like cinematics and voice. The game ranked as the best-selling visual novel in Japan for the time of its release, continuing to chart in the national top 50 for nearly five months afterward. 0verflow would then go on to produce multiple sequels including a spin-off of the original story called Summer Days, and a parallel story called Cross Days. Another spin-off, Island Days, has been developed by Klon for the Nintendo 3DS. School Days was remastered as School Days HQ on October 2010, and localized in North America on June 2012. The original game was officially discontinued on April 2011.

Following the game's release, School Days made several transitions into other media. The original story was adapted into a manga and serialized in the Kadokawa Shoten magazine Comp Ace; it was later published into two volumes. Comic anthologies, light novels and art books were also published, as were audio dramas and several albums of music. An animated television series, two direct-to-video (OVA) single releases and a concert film were also produced, the first of which became a precursor for an internet meme when its finale was pulled from broadcast.

Gameplay

As a visual novel, School Days contains extremely minimal gameplay. The game's core onscreen presentation is composed of scenes that are viewed from a mostly third-person perspective. At predetermined intervals, the game pauses, and players are presented with one to two responses or actions relevant to the scene in progress to make, or not make, on behalf of characters. Each selection branches the game's progress up to that point in an alternate direction, while also causing the player's love toward a character to blossom, plateau, or diminish, thus providing for a nonlinear storytelling experience. Being an erotic title, relationships between characters may become sexual; scenes of this kind depict a varying combination of French kissing, masturbation, oral sex, intercourse, and nudity (both female and male) or a combination thereof. Genitalia are pixelated in the original Japanese releases, but the Western release of School Days HQ is uncensored. Sex scenes are omitted from the PlayStation 2 and PlayStation Portable ports of the game.

Each route the game takes invariably concludes with an ending specific to the choices made up to that point. Depending on these choices, the outcome of the story will either be good or bad. School Days became popularly known for its bad endings, which depict the deaths of characters. In one ending titled "Bloody End", a yandere Kotonoha slits Sekai's jugular vein open with a dōzuki, causing Sekai to collapse and die in a fountain of blood to the manic laughter of her assailant and the horror of Makoto. In another called "Forever", Kotonoha commits suicide leaning over and falling off the roof of a school, landing headfirst on a sidewalk to the horror of Makoto and Sekai. The game's good endings, by contrast, depict the well-being of characters and their relationships. In the ending "Christmas Eve", Makoto and Kotonoha share an embrace and make love in a hotel room as snow falls around a surrounding cityscape. In another titled "Two Lovers", Kotonoha and Sekai agree to have a polyamorous relationship with Makoto instead of rivaling with each other. Because of the numerous alternate endings that can be achieved, players who wish to watch additional endings and sex scenes will have to play through the game more than once.

Unlike traditional visual novels that consist of static characters with subtitled dialogue, School Days is unusual in that it incorporates motion and voice, making it reminiscent of an animated series. Cinematics naturally play on their own, and players are afforded the ability to pause, fast-forward, and even skip those they've seen before. Male and female voices can be muted, subtitles can be turned on or off and the game can be played from a window or fullscreen ratio. Progress can be saved at any time in up to 100 slots and loaded from either the main menu or during play.

Plot

School Days focuses on the life of Makoto Itou, a first-year high school student living with his divorced and unseen mother in the fictional city of Haramihama. During his second term, he becomes infatuated with Kotonoha Katsura, a shy schoolmate who shares train rides with him to and from campus. When the classroom seating plan of his class is rearranged, he becomes acquaintanced with Sekai Saionji, an upbeat girl who takes a special interest in his newfound crush, introducing the two and providing them the grounds to meet. Despite her triumphant efforts, however, Sekai becomes jealous of the new couple, having developed feelings for Makoto herself.

Development
School Days was 0verflow's tenth game to develop. News of School Days first surfaced on October 5, 2004, when 0verflow posted a link to the game's then-live website and development log on their official site. In the blog, 0verflow revealed that School Days had been in pre-production for roughly two years and would be a fully animated game. Updates on the development of the game were scheduled for Tuesdays and Fridays, and the company encouraged fans to attend Dream Party 2004, an upcoming anime convention at Tokyo Big Sight in Ariake, on October 11, where it would make its first public showcase of the game and characters. A follow-up of the venue was made on October 15. Toward the end of the month on October 26, 0verflow posted that new information about School Days would be circulated in the November issue of Tech Gian, an adult magazine published by Enterbrain.

Promotion for the game began shortly after. In a November 6 development post, 0verflow announced that it was planning a public screening of new game material, but was experiencing difficulty acquiring space for it. The company had initially chosen to have the venue in Akihabara but was unable to find a retailer willing to host it, prompting a visit to Osaka the following week. News that the game would contain music by artists such as Minami Kuribayashi, Haruko Momoi, Yozuca* and YURIA was posted on November 30, along with a release date change to February 25, 2005.

On December 28, 2004, 0verflow released a public trial of School Days and announced that the company would be attending Comiket 67 at Tokyo Big Sight from December 29 to 30, handing out phonecards to the first 50 visitors to their booth. Two months later, on February 2, 2005, the company announced that the game had been postponed again to April 28. From April 5 to April 8, 0verflow concluded their development log with comments from Soyogi Tōno, Kaname Yuzuki, Tatsuya Hirai, Yuki Matsunaga, Hikaru Isshiki and Hana Yamamoto, the respective voices of Kotonoha, Sekai, Makoto, Otome, Hikari and Setsuna. To address bugs that were later found in the game, 0verflow released a patch to bring School Days to a stable build of 1.11. 
On June 26, 2007, 0verflow and Lantis-net radio began to air an internet radio drama called "Radio School Days". Broadcasts finished on March 28, 2008, with 39 episodes aired. On April 21, 2011, 0verflow announced via their blog that support for School Days was being discontinued.

Release
School Days was ported to three other platforms. The first of these was by AiCherry, an interactive movie developer, who announced on August 20, 2007, that it had picked up the game for development, releasing it as a four disc DVD game on September 28. That same year, on August 31, Interchannel posted a link on their blog to the official website of School Days L×H, a PlayStation 2 (PS2) port in development by Guyzware, that would be edited of explicit sexual content and fanservice. The game was released on January 17, 2008 and assessed by the Computer Entertainment Rating Organization (CERO), Japan's primary video game content rating system, receiving a 15-years-or-older "C" rating for sexual themes and profanity. The third and final port was developed by PalaceGame for the PlayStation Portable (PSP). After postponing the game on May 11, it was released as four UMDs on June 30, 2010.

0verflow opened what would become the homepage for School Days HQ on May 21, 2010, a remastering of the original game initially scheduled for release in August. The site was finished June 3, and on July 16, the game was postponed to September 24. A trial was publicly released for download on August 7, and from August 20 to September 28, 0verflow promoted the game. Customers who had purchased the original School Days would be given the opportunity to upgrade to HQ for a fee until October 11, by either mailing in their game disc or visiting stores in Akihabara, Osaka or Nagoya. Distributors offered collectable phonecards for reservations, and after a second date change on September 10, the game was released October 8.

On March 3, 2011, 0verflow acknowledged Sekai Project, an unofficial fan translation group, who had reportedly begun localizing School Days in April 2006. Partnering with American distributor JAST USA, School Days HQ, uncensored in English, was announced for a North American release on March 11, 2011. Development instead continued into 2012, and on May 18, JAST announced that the company had begun taking pre-orders for the Collector's Edition, a bundled release of the game packaged with a keychain and mousepad. The company announced weeks later on June 1 that School Days HQ had gone gold. Following news on June 26 that the company would exhibit the game at Anime Expo 2012, JAST made an update to the June 1 announcement that School Days HQ had begun shipping. The downloadable version of the game was later released on August 6.

Sales
In a national sales ranking of bishōjo games in PCNEWS, a now-defunct Japanese online magazine, School Days premiered as the number one game sold for the second half of April 2005, the second and seventeenth for the first and second halves of May, the fifth and twenty-sixth for the first and second halves of June, and twenty-seventh for the first half of July. The School Days renewal edition, released a week after the previous ranking, continued to chart on behalf of the game; it ranked as the thirty-third most sold game for the second half of July, before ending as the thirty-fifth and forty-ninth for the first and second halves of August.

Getchu.com, a major distributor of visual novels and domestic anime products, recorded similar sales. School Days for Windows premiered as the number one game sold for the month of its release, and seventh most for May, ranking as the number one game sold for the first half of 2005 and ninth for the year. The following year, the School Days renewal edition charted as the twentieth most sold game for July 2007, dropping to thirtieth from August to October. School Days HQ ranked as the sixth most sold game for October 2010 but failed to chart thereafter.

According to Gamasutra, a video gaming news site, School Days L×H ranked as the number one PlayStation 2 game sold for January 2008.

Media

Related visual novels
0verflow developed several visual novels related to School Days, sharing the same universe. Prior to the development of School Days, 0verflow developed the Radish Vacation visual novel series. The first is Snow Radish Vacation released on December 28, 2001, followed by Summer Radish Vacation on April 1, 2003, and finally Summer Radish Vacation 2 on August 13, 2004.

A prequel titled Summer Days, was released on June 23, 2006, retelling the original game during summer vacation and from the perspective of Setsuna Kiyoura. Unlike its predecessor, however, Summer Days was almost universally panned for its heavily bugged state, loads of patches, and recall. Another spin-off titled Cross Days was released on March 19, 2010. Set in the same continuity as School Days, Cross Days follows the life of another protagonist, Yuuki Ashikaga, a high school freshman who also finds himself caught between the affection of two girls, Roka Kitsuregawa and Kotonoha Katsura, during his second term at Sakakino Academy. The game also features yaoi scenarios, during which Yuuki cross-dresses as a maid. 0verflow released Shiny Days on February 2, 2012, which is a remastered version of Summer Days with a new heroine and higher quality animations. A spin-off, Island Days, was developed for the Nintendo 3DS and was released in Japan on July 3, 2014. The game, developed by Klon, focuses on Makoto and the girls becoming trapped on a remote island and includes tower defense elements.

Manga
Based on the story of the original game, School Days was reimagined as a manga, illustrated by Homare Sakazuki and serialized in the Kadokawa Shoten magazine Comp Ace from May 26, 2006 to September 26, 2007. On July 12, 2007, 0verflow announced that the manga had been collected into its first volume, comprising five chapters set to be released on July 24. Later that year, the second and final volume, comprising the remaining seven chapters, was released on November 21.

Various artists also produced short manga of School Days that were compiled into two comic anthologies. The "School Days Comic Anthology" was released by Ohzora Publishing on October 25, 2005, under their P-mate Comics imprint, containing nine short manga by individual artists. On February 25, 2008, Ichijinsha printed the "School Days Kotonoha Anthology" under their DNA Media Comics imprint, a collection of manga primarily featuring the character Kotonoha Katsura.

Books and publications
In addition to the manga, School Days was adapted into other print media. The first of these was the "School Days Visual Guide Book" published by Jive on September 16, 2005, an artbook of character illustrations, model sheets, screenplay, storyboards and a visual hierarchy of the choices and corresponding scenes in the game. Separate editions for the anime television series and Playstation 2 game were also published, on December 1, 2007 and March 21, 2008, respectively.

The first of four light novels, all illustrated by Junji Goto, was written by Ryuna Okada and printed by Harvest Publishing under their Harvest Novels imprint. Released on December 1, 2005,  retells the original story from the perspective of Sekai. Two light novels were also published by Jive, the first of which was written by Takuya Baba,  and printed on December 16, 2005, and a second by Hiro Akiduki, "School Days: Innocent Blue",  released on April 28.

Anime

School Days was adapted into a twelve-episode anime television series by TNK. Concrete news of this first appeared on June 1, 2007, when 0verflow announced via its blog that the show's official website had gone live. Stations participating in the broadcast included TV Kanagawa, Chiba TV, TV Aichi, TV Osaka, TV Saitama and AT-X, the premiere of which would air on TV Kanagawa on July 3. The anime was aired until September 27 and finished its broadcast on AT-X. From September 26, 2007, to February 27, 2008, the series was compiled into six limited and regular edition DVDs.

TNK also produced two direct-to-video (OVA) episodes of School Days. The first, titled "Valentine Days", was bundled with limited edition copies of School Days L×H, and features an unrelated comedic romp through Valentine's Day as Kotonoha, Sekai, and Otome try to give Makoto giri chocos. The second, "Magical Heart Kokoro-chan", jaunts the series into magical girl territory, portraying Kokoro Katsura as the superheroine Magical Heart; it was released on March 26, 2008.

Discotek Media has acquired the television series and the "Magical Heart Kokoro-chan" OVA to be released on DVD on June 24, 2014, with English subtitles.

Delay of finale

On September 17, 2007, the day before the twelfth and final episode of the televised anime was to air on TV Kanagawa, a sixteen-year-old girl murdered her forty-five-year-old father in their Kyoto home with an axe. TV Kanagawa promptly cancelled the Tuesday airing of the finale for its similarly violent content, replacing it instead with a thirty-minute video compilation of scenery footage from Europe including Norway, played to August Wilhelmj's "Air on the G String". Newspapers such as The Japan Times and Mainichi Shimbun reported on the killing and episode preempt on September 19. According to Mainichi Shimbun, Chiba TV and TV Aichi had also cancelled their airings, with AT-X the only station remaining indecisive. 0verflow issued an apology through their blog the same day, asking viewers to stay tuned for updates. In the following week, 0verflow announced that it had arranged for two screenings of the edited finale at the Akihabara 3D Theater on September 27. Those wishing to attend would be required to register a seat by email, be at least 18 years old with photo ID, and bring a Windows copy of School Days or Summer Days. That same day AT-X announced that it had decided to air the unedited finale on September 27 and October 1.

In the wake of the broadcast change, a screen capture of the Norwegian M/S Skagastøl from the slideshow surfaced on 4chan alongside the caption "Nice boat.", a phrase which gained popularity in Japan. Google Trends recorded a spike in "Nice Boat" searches around the third quarter of 2007 while Yomiuri Shinbun, a Japanese newspaper, reported that "Nice boat" was the tenth most popular Yahoo! Japan search from September 17 to September 23.

Nice Boat had become so well known that it was used in other media. The meme appeared as an Easter egg in the first episode of Ef: A Tale of Memories., and was parodied on February 13, 2009, when the Kadokawa Pictures YouTube channel uploaded a short montage of sailboats instead of the previously scheduled premiere of The Melancholy of Haruhi Suzumiya. 0verflow capitalized on the popularity of the phrase, naming their booth at Comiket 73 "Nice boat." and selling meme-inspired merchandise. TNK also paid homage to the meme in "Magical Heart Kokoro-chan", a special direct-to-video episode of the animated series.

Concert film
Besides the video releases of the School Days anime, a concert film, the School Days Secret Live DVD, was also produced by HOBiRECORDS. Released on June 26, 2006, in conjunction with Summer Days, the film contains footage of a concert held on June 15, 2005 featuring the performances of Miyuki Hashimoto, YURIA,  rino, yozuca* and Minami Kuribayashi.

Audio CDs
From 2005 to 2010, Lantis published six albums of School Days music. The "School Days Vocal Album", a compilation featuring all nine of the game's closing themes, as performed by artists Kiriko, Yozuca*, Miyuki Hashimoto, Yuria, Halko Momoi, Minami Kuribayashi, Rino, and Kanako Ito was the first to be distributed, sharing its April 28, 2005, date with the release of the game itself. The remaining twenty-eight background scores, composed by KIRIKO/HIKO Sound, were released on July 21, officially completing the game's soundtrack. Another compilation, the "School Days Vocal Complete Album" featuring songs from Summer Days and Cross Days, was released on October 8, 2010.

Three weeks after the premiere of the televised anime on July 25, 2007, Lantis published the single "Innocent Blue" by DeviceHigh, a four-track disc featuring the anime opening of the same name, a disco-inspired song called Dancin' Joker, and their instrumentals. Lantis followed with "School Days: Ending Theme+" on August 22, a sixteen-track disc containing all of the show's closing themes and background scores on September 26.

In addition to music albums, six audio dramas were also produced. "School Days Little Promise", a chronicle of Sekai and Setsuna's childhoods, was the first. Featuring music by Kiriko/Hiko Sound and Kanako Ito, Hobirecords published "Little Promise" as a two-disc set, which 0verflow scheduled for release January 27, 2006. Pre-releases were sold at Comiket 69 from December 29 to 30, 2005. Sometime afterward however, 0verflow announced that pre-released copies of Little Promise were defective, and asked customers to mail in their discs for replacements. The release was also postponed to February 24. Lantis released the remaining five dramas. "School Days Drama CD Vol. 1 Himitsu Hanazono" (ヒ・ミ・ツの花園), a merrymaking of the series six main girls, was released on August 8, 2007. A second, "School Days Drama CD Vol 2. Koi no Nou-hau" (恋のノ・ウ・ハ・ウ), was released October 24, 2007.

Merchandise
Considerable effort was made to market and promote School Days before and after its release, including the sale of brand merchandise and use of incentives. Through public venues and through the company's online store, 0verflow sold brand keystraps, mousepads, phonecards, book covers, mugs, t-shirts, dakimakura cases, PVC figures, lanyards, business card holders and cosplay material such as the girls' school uniforms and plastic dōzuki.

Reception
The anime series has won the Hisashi Maeda Award in the 7th Japanese Otaku Awards in 2007.

Anime News Network'''s Theron Martin enjoyed the anime series and gave it a B+, saying "Despite its efforts to analyze and reinterpret harem series, School Days probably would have sunk into anime obscurity if not for the nature of its final episode and the circumstances surrounding it not airing. However, those analytical efforts give it a value beyond its sensationalism. If viewers find Makoto unlikable, it is because he was meant to be an object lesson, not someone that they should want to relate to. That the actions of him and the others progressively push the series away from what's expected of harem series holds a fascination akin to watching a train wreck play out in very slow motion". UK Anime Network, a British online anime and manga magazine, gave the television series a 7 out of 10, summarizing it as "An utter subversion of the high school romance genre, which is disturbing and unsettling... yet oddly compelling in its own way." Takato of the french website Manga News gave the anime series 17 out of 20, and describes the series as "School Days is not a joyful romance but rather oppressive, destabilizing and unhealthy because of the behavior of the characters. We are certainly shocked, but this is precisely what makes the strength of this unique series. School Days is certainly a series to watch to be amazed, or to be amused by all these humiliations if you are sadistic." THEM Anime Reviews, a website devoted to the review of anime, gave the series a less favorable 1 out of 5 stars, citing "overblown, shallow, and flat" characters and that although "School Days looks fascinating when you see screenshots of it and read episode guides", the reviewer found it to be "annoying, stupid, mean-spirited, and full of some of the biggest idiots [he had] seen in an anime in a long time."

On June 12, 2015, the Chinese Ministry of Culture listed School Days'' among 38 anime and manga titles banned in China.

References

Further reading

External links
School Days HQ English website
School Days HQ visual novel at 0verflow 
Sekai Project

2005 video games
2007 anime television series debuts
2007 Japanese television series endings
2007 manga
2008 anime OVAs
Anime television series based on video games
Audio plays
Bandai Namco franchises
Bishōjo games
Censored television series
Days series
Discotek Media
DVD interactive technology
Eroge
Harem anime and manga
High school-themed video games
Lantis (company)
Manga based on video games
Obscenity controversies
PlayStation 2 games
PlayStation Portable games
Romance anime and manga
School life in anime and manga
Films with screenplays by Makoto Uezu
Slice of life anime and manga
Fiction about suicide
Television censorship in China
TNK (company)
Video games developed in Japan
Visual novels
Windows games
Works banned in China
Polyamory in fiction